Peter Salmon  (born 9 February 1976) is a New Zealand based film and television writer/director.

Salmon has directed many successful short films since graduating from film school in 1996.

Career

Salmon's first 35 mm short film Playing Possum was made in association with Creative New Zealand in 1998. It screened in competition at Clermont Ferrand, Edinburgh Film Festival and Valladolid International Film Festival. It also screened at Telluride Film Festival, Rotterdam, New York Children's Festival, Mill Valley, Hof, Brisbane and L'Étrange Festival (where it won the Grand Prix and audience awards) to name but a few.

His next short film, a science fiction drama, Letters about the Weather, starring Sara Wiseman (winner of best performance in a short film (NZ film awards 2000)). The film was made with funding from the New Zealand Film Commission in 1999. It screened in competition in Clermont Ferrand (where it received an Ecumenical Jury Special Mention) and Puchon Fantastic in Korea. It also screened in Telluride Film Festival, Cannes Forum and San Tropez.

His short film Fog was made in 2007 with Maxim Films and the New Zealand Film Commission on location in Ngawi, New Zealand. It stars Chelsie Preston Crayford (winner of best performance in a short film (NZ film awards 2007)). 'Fog' premiered in Cannes Critics Week in 2007. It has since screened in Melbourne, New Zealand and Stockholm.

Salmon's latest short film The Box set in New York City premiered at the New Zealand Film Festival in 2010.

Alongside his film projects Salmon is a director and writer of television programmes, notably the internationally successful South Pacific Pictures teen drama series Being Eve. The show was a finalist in the International Emmy Awards 2002 (Children & Young People), Gold World Medal Winner (Teen Programmes) in the New York Festivals 2002, and received the 2002 TV Guide New Zealand Television Awards for Best Drama Series, Best Contribution Soundtrack and Best Contribution Design. Salmon has also directed five episodes for South Pacific Pictures drama series, Go Girls.

Salmon also directed the motion capture elements for Weta Workshop and Nelvana's successful animation series Jane and the Dragon. He went on to direct the multi award-winning show Outrageous Fortune and wrote for the popular pre school animation series, "The WotWots".

Salmon directed three episodes for "Power Rangers RPM" and went on to direct "This is not my Life", a science fiction drama for TVNZ. He also directed episodes of "Power Rangers Samurai" and "Power Rangers Dino Charge".

Personal life
Salmon is married to actress Morgana O'Reilly. In June 2015, the couple announced they were expecting their first child, and O'Reilly gave birth to their daughter on 25 August.

Filmography
Director / Writer - Film
 The Box (2010): Director/Co-Writer
 Fog (2007): Director
 Letters About The Weather (1999): Director/Co-Writer
 Playing Possum (1998): Director/Writer
 The Creakers (1997): Director/Writer

Director / Writer - Television

 Halifax: Retribution (2020): Director
 Harrow (2018): Director
 Wanted (2017–2018): Director
 Doctor Doctor (2016): Director
 Rake (2016): Director
 The Beautiful Lie (2015): Director
Power Rangers: Dino Charge (2015): Director
Nowhere Boys (2014): Director
Mr & Mrs Murder (2013): Director
Agent Anna (2013): Director
Nothing Trivial (2012): Director
Power Rangers: Samurai (2011): Director
This is not my Life (2009): Director
Power Rangers: RPM (2009): Director
The WotWots (2009): Writer
Go Girls (2008): Director
Outrageous Fortune (Series 4) (2008): Director
My Story (2007): Director/Co-Writer
Jane and the Dragon (2005): Motion Capture Director
Being Eve (2001): Director/Writer

References

External links 
 Official website of Peter Salmon
 
 'Fog' official Facebook page
 Godzone Pictures, production company for 'Playing Possum' & 'Letters about the Weather'

New Zealand film directors
New Zealand screenwriters
Male screenwriters
English-language film directors
Living people
1976 births